New Panvel is a residential, commercial and educational node of Navi Mumbai, Maharashtra and comes under the Konkan division. New Panvel was developed on marshy land and was previously a Mango cultivated area.  New Panvel is divided into two parts: New Panvel (E), on the eastern side of Panvel railway station and Khanda Colony or New Panvel (W) on the western side of it. Both parts of New Panvel are connected by a flyover bridge also known as Khanda Colony Flyover. New Panvel (W) is also popularly called Khanda Colony by the local villagers, as the city is adjacent to two small villages Dhakta Khanda and Motha Khanda (Greater Khanda).

Khanda and Khandeshwar Railway stations derive their names from a very old Shiva Temple known as Khandeshwar Mahadev along the sides of the lake of Khandeshwar. The locals are host the Mahashivratri festival on the banks of the Khandeshwar lake every year. Takka Naka is a new node of New Panvel being developed by CIDCO. Major commercial activities are present in sectors 15 to 19 just outside the railway station on the eastern side. K Mall is a shopping center in New Panvel's, Takka Naka node while Orion Mall along the Mumbai-Pune highway beside the Panvel Bus depot is emerging as a shopping destination in town.

The planned Navi Mumbai International Airport is expected to affect real estate prices in the surrounding area of New Panvel which are under development. Sector 17 of New Panvel West bound by JNPT bypass and NH-4 alongside Motha Khanda is located near the railway station. A few residential buildings in New Panvel West come under the "A Type" CIDCO settlements, offer budget housing for lower income groups.

Geography
Almost the whole of New Panvel (W) has been planned and developed. New Panvel (E) is under constant, rapid and organised development. New Panvel (E) also boasts of some good countryside view with the Prabalgad Fort and Prabalmachi Mountain located to the east. New Panvel also has a river locally known as river 'Kalundre' situated on the banks of Panvel Creek. Kauva Galli is a road near Khandeshwar temple known for its enormous crow population, large amount of crows & cranes use this place for breeding as it is near the water source of Khandeshwar lake.

Demographics
The development and maintenance authority of New Panvel is City and Industrial Development Corporation (CIDCO).

New Panvel is located on the western side of the Mumbai-Bangalore National Highway and the Mumbai-Pune Expressway.

New Panvel is divided in two parts – New Panvel East and New Panvel West, later called as Khanda Colony. They have 23 and 19 sectors respectively.

New Panvel is just adjacent to the proposed Navi Mumbai International Airport. A Reliance SEZ is also coming up in the vicinity. It has a number of schools, colleges and hospitals to meet the needs of its residents.
development and maintenance in two parts – New Panvel East and New Panvel West, later called as Khanda Colony. They have 23 and 19 sectors respectively.

Industries

Panvel is surrounded by some major Maharashtra Industrial Development Corporation (MIDC) managed regions like Patalganga, Taloja, Nagothane, Roha, Bhiwandi and Khopoli.

Some of the Indian industry majors like Larsen & Toubro, Reliance, Hindustan Organic Chemicals Limited, ONGC, IPCL are based around Panvel providing mass employment. The JNPT port is also located near Panvel. New SEZ declared by government are coming around Panvel.

Tourism in Panvel

A number of tourism spots are located near Panvel.

Khandeshwar park around the Khandeshwar Mahadev mandir and the Khandeshwar lake.

The Karnala fort and Karnala Bird Sanctuary. Karnala is located around 65 km away from Mumbai, 120 km away from Pune and 13 km away from Panvel. The sanctuary is 25m above sea level while the fort itself is 370m above sea level.

The Bet El Synagogue. The only one in Panvel which is one of the most well known religious place around where both Jews and Non-Jews can visit.

Two of the eight Ashtavinayak temples of Lord Ganesha are located near Panvel, Ballaleshwar at (Pali) and Varadvinayak at Mahad near Khopoli.

Transport 

Panvel is an important junction point as many major highways meet and pass through the city. The Mumbai-Pune Expressway, Sion-Panvel Expressway, NH 4B and NH 17 start from here while NH 4 passes through Panvel. The proposed SH 54 from Panvel to Bhimashankar will boost connectivity until Chakan. Roads inside New Panvel are maintained by CIDCO while those in old Panvel by PMC. New Panvel, being developed by CIDCO, has well planned and wide lane major roads and even the arterial roads are of two lanes. Old Panvel has relatively less maintained roads which are very congested due to lack of planning on part of the PMC.

Proposed airport 

The new Navi Mumbai International Airport, which is to come up around the Panvel-Kopra area, would be built through public-private partnership (PPP) — with private sector partner getting 74% equity while Airport Authority of India (AAI) and Maharashtra government through CIDCO holding 13% each. The International Civil Aviation Organisation (ICAO) has already given techno-feasibility clearance to the Navi Mumbai airport and central cabinet has cleared it.

The airport site is located in an area of 1160 hectares accommodating two parallel runways for simultaneous & independent operations with provision of full length taxi ways on either side of the runways. The airfield has been designed to accommodate the new large aircraft compatible with International Civil Aviation Organisation (ICAO) Aerodrome Code 4F.

Railway 

Panvel railway station is one of the most important junctions on the Konkan Railway. Harbour line from Mumbai CST, central line from Diva/Karjat, western freight corridor from JNPT and the Konkan railway line from Mangalore meet at Panvel. The Panvel railway station comes under the Mumbai division of central railway.

Panvel is a terminating station of Mumbai railway's harbour line. Platforms 1, 2, 3 & 4 are for suburban trains while platforms 5, 6 & 7 are for main line trains. Panvel is the busiest railway station in Navi Mumbai.  9 pairs of daily express trains, 13 pairs of non-daily express trains and 12 daily commuter (passenger) trains stop here. Konkan railway connecting Mumbai to south India passes through Panvel. Also, the Ernakulam-Nizamuddin Duronto has a technical halt at Panvel for crew change, refuelling, and catering. In addition, Panvel handles 116 suburban trains that are connected to Mumbai CST, Wadala Road, Andheri and Thane.

Panvel is a major station and is considered equivalent to Mumbai's stations for trains which skip Mumbai. The trains run on diesel traction and alternating current (the tracks to Konkan are not electrified south of Panvel), and Panvel is a refueling point for their locomotives. In addition to refueling, Panvel has a huge number of parcel bookings, and most trains stop for periods varying from 5 minutes to 20 minutes for technical purposes. Panvel also handles crew and locomotive change for long-distance passenger / freight trains. Panvel railway station also has siding for suburbs trains located in New Panvel (W) and for locomotives in New Panvel (E). There are two railway stations in the node. First one is located in Sector 17 of New Panvel (E) and second is located in sector 17 of New Panvel (W) named Khandeshwar.

Bus 
There are two main bus stands in Panvel - ST stand on the National Highway and NMMT stand near Railway Station. The ST buses are available from Panvel to Thane, Kalyan, Dombivali, Badlapur, Dadar, Uran as well as beyond city. NMMT buses are available from Panvel to Dadar, Thane, Vashi and inner sectors of New Panvel.

Education 
 Chhatrapati Shivaji Maharaj University, Near Shedung Toll Plaza, Old Mumbai-Pune Highway, Panvel, Navi Mumbai, Maharashtra
 St. Wilfred's College for Arts, Commerce and Science, Mumbai
 Chhatrapati Shivaji Maharaj Institute of Technology, Mumbai
 St Wilfred's LAW College, Mumbai
 St Wilfred's Institute of Architecture, Mumbai
 St Wilfred's Institute of Pharmacy, Mumbai
 Changu Kana Thakur Degree College
 Aagri Shikshan Sanstha
 Phadke Vidyalaya
 St. George School
 Pillai's Global Academy
 Pillai College of Engineering (Autonomous) - New Panvel (E)
 Mahatma School of Academics and Sports - New Panvel (W)
 D.A.V. Public School, Sector-10, New Panvel (East). D.A.V. is a charitable organisation and one of the largest non-governmental organisations in the country in the field of education and social welfare.
 D.D. Vispute College science, commerce and management - New Panvel
 N.N. Paliwala Jr. College - New Panvel
 Shantiniketan Public School, New Panvel (E)
 Pillai College of Arts, Commerce and Science, New Panvel
 St.Thomas Academy of Education under the aegis of Beyond Boundaries Foundation for Better Education, Vichumbe, N.Panvel
 Anjuman-I-Islam's Kalsekar Technical Campus

References

www.pcacs.ac.in

External links
The Gazetters Department: Panvel
pcacs- panvel

Navi Mumbai